This is a list of all tornadoes that were confirmed throughout Europe by the European Severe Storms Laboratory and local meteorological agencies during 2011. Unlike the United States, the original Fujita Scale and the TORRO scale are used to rank tornadoes across the continent.

European yearly total

January

January 1 event

January 24 event

January 25 event

February

February 2 event

February 16 event

February 19 event

February 23 event

February 24 event

February 25 event

March

March 21 event

April

April 2 event

April 5 event

April 8 event

April 28 event

April 30 event

May

May 12 event

May 14 event

May 15 event

May 16 event

May 18 event

May 19 event

May 21 event

May 26 event

May 27 event

May 28 event

June

June 4 event

June 5 event

June 6 event

June 8 event

June 9 event

June 14 event

June 16 event

June 21 event

June 22 event

June 24 event

June 30 event

July

July 2 event

July 8 event

August

August 1 event

August 22 event

October

October 9 event

October 10 event

October 25 event

November

November 3 event

November 7 event

November 15 event

November 19 event

November 21 event

November 22 event

November 29 event

December

December 3 event

December 4 event

December 12 event

December 14 event

December 16 event

December 23 event

December 24 event

December 25 event

See also 
 Tornadoes of 2011

Tornadoes of 2011
 2011
European tornadoes in 2011
Tornadoes
2011-related lists
2011 disasters in Europe